The 2005 Molson Indy Toronto was the sixth round of the 2005 Bridgestone Presents the Champ Car World Series Powered by Ford season, held on July 10, 2005 on the streets of Exhibition Place in Toronto, Ontario, Canada.  Sébastien Bourdais was the pole sitter and Justin Wilson won the race.  It was the first American open wheel victory for the British driver.  Sébastien Bourdais took the season points lead by finishing fifth and would end up keeping the points lead for the remainder of the season.

Qualifying results

Race

* Race finished under caution.

Caution flags

Notes

 New Race Record Justin Wilson 1:46:10.177
 Average Speed 85.296 mph

Championship standings after the race
Drivers' Championship standings

 Note: Only the top five positions are included.

References

External links
Full Weekend Times & Results
Friday Qualifying Results
Saturday Qualifying Results
Race Box Score

Toronto
Indy Toronto
Molson
2005 in Toronto